Kotkay or Kotkai is a small village near Aloch in the Shangla District of Khyber-Pakhtunkhwa province of Pakistan.

References
http://www.puran.20m.com/
http://www.pakistan-karachi.info/Puran

Villages in Shangla District